The 
is a Nanboku-chō period collection of Japanese poetry compiled by Munenaga Shinnō ca. 1381. Although commissioned by Emperor Chōkei (r. 1368-83) of the Southern Court, it is not included in the Nijūichidaishū, i.e., the twenty-one imperial anthologies for political reasons – the "official" anthologies had been sponsored by the rival Northern Court and the Ashikaga shōguns. 

The Shin'yō Wakashū consists of twenty books, 1,420 poems in total. The poems included are mainly from the Nijō poetic school, but there is also a substantial amount of warrior-class poems.

Notes

1380s in Japan
Japanese poetry anthologies
Late Old Japanese texts